Titoceres is a genus of beetle in the family Cerambycidae.

Species
Titoceres arabicus Breuning, 1962
Titoceres jaspideus (Audinet-Serville, 1835)

References

Ceroplesini
Beetle genera